José Tenoch Huerta Mejía (born 29 January 1981) is a Mexican actor. He has appeared in a number of movies in Latin America and Spain, starring in both feature films, short films, and Narcos: Mexico, credited as Tenoch Huerta. He is featured in Mónica Maristain's book, 30 Actors Made in Mexico. He plays Namor in the Marvel Cinematic Universe (MCU), starting with the film Black Panther: Wakanda Forever (2022), in which he is credited as Tenoch Huerta Mejía.

Early life
Huerta was born in Ecatepec de Morelos, State of Mexico, on 29 January 1981. His father, a film buff, enrolled him in an acting course with María Elena Saldaña, and Huerta's later studies were alongside Carlos Torres Torrija and Luis Felipe Tovar.

Huerta is of Indigenous descent, with a Nahua maternal great-grandmother and a Purépecha paternal great-great-grandmother. He does not self-identify as Indigenous; however, he encourages people to learn more about their Indigenous heritage within and outside the community.

Career
Huerta made his acting career debut as a minor character in the film Asi del precipicio (2006). In 2009, he appeared in Cary Joji Fukunaga's film Sin nombre in the role of Li'l Mago, leader of the Tapachula faction of the notorious Mara Salvatrucha gang.

In 2015, he appeared as Carlos Mamani in the biographical disaster survival film The 33, Alejo in Camino. In 2018, he began portraying Rafael Caro Quintero in Netflix's Narcos: Mexico.

In 2021, he appeared as Juan in The Forever Purge, the fifth film of The Purge franchise, alongside his fellow Narcos: Mexico costar Alejandro Edda.

In 2022, during a San Diego Comic-Con presentation for the Marvel Studios film Black Panther: Wakanda Forever, Huerta was revealed to have joined the cast to portray Namor. In Mexico, most reactions were positive, with a minority of negative reactions characterized as expressions of racism and malinchismo. Huerta himself spoke against racism in the film industry and stated that he was excited to play the character.

Awards
Huerta won Best Actor at the Short Short Film Festival in Mexico City for his performance in Alonso Ruizpalacios' Café paraíso. He has also received five nominations for the Ariel Award, winning Best Actor for his role in Días de Gracia in 2012. Huerta won NAACP Image Awards 2023 supporting role in a motion picture, for his role Namor in Black Panther: Wakanda Forever.

Filmography

Film

Television

References

External links
 

Ariel Award winners
Best Actor Ariel Award winners
Living people
Male actors from Mexico City
Mexican male film actors
1981 births
People from Ecatepec de Morelos
Mexican people of indigenous peoples descent
Mexican people of Purépecha descent